4-O-beta-D-mannosyl-D-glucose phosphorylase (mannosylglucose phosphorylase) is an enzyme with systematic name 4-O-beta-D-mannopyranosyl-D-glucopyranose:phosphate alpha-D-mannosyltransferase. This enzyme catalyses the following chemical reaction

 4-O-beta-D-mannopyranosyl-D-glucopyranose + phosphate  D-glucose + alpha-D-mannose 1-phosphate

This enzyme forms part of a mannan catabolic pathway in the anaerobic bacterium Bacteroides fragilis NCTC 9343.

References

External links 

EC 2.4.1